Husnabad Assembly constituency is a constituency of Telangana Legislative Assembly, India. It is one of 13 constituencies in Siddipet district. It is part of Karimnagar Lok Sabha constituency.

Vodithela Sathish Kumar of Telangana Rashtra Samithi won the seat for the first time in 2014 Assembly Election.

Mandals
The Assembly Constituency presently comprises the following Mandals:

Election results

Telangana Legislative Assembly election, 2018

Telangana Legislative Assembly election, 2014

See also
 List of constituencies of Telangana Legislative Assembly

References

Assembly constituencies of Telangana
Karimnagar district